Purakaunui may refer to the following in New Zealand:

 Pūrākaunui, a locality in Dunedin
Pūrākaunui Inlet, a coastal feature close to Pūrākaunui
 Purakaunui, Clutha, a locality in Clutha District
 Purakaunui Falls, waterfalls near Purakaunui
 Purakaunui River, the river flowing over the Purakaunui Falls